The bronze-brown cowbird is a species of bird in the family Icteridae. It was long thought to be an isolated population of bronzed cowbird. Because it is found only in a narrow coastal band in northwestern Colombia, it is considered near-threatened by the International Union for Conservation of Nature.

References

Birds described in 1829